Anselevicius is a surname. Notable people with the surname include:

Evelyn Anselevicius (1923–2003), American artist
George Anselevicius (1923–2008), Lithuanian-born American architect